"Saigo no Holy Night" (Japanese: 最後のHoly Night or さいごのホーリーナイト) is the second single by Kiyotaka Sugiyama released on November 6, 1986 by VAP. The song charted at No. 2 on the Oricon charts, selling 253,000 copies.

Background 
When the song was initially released, it was used as a Japan Airlines campaign song, also being used as a commercial song for Minolta and for Tsuburaya Productions. In the Tokyo Broadcasting System series The Best Ten, he won first place for a total of four weeks.

Although it is a Christmas song, it became a hit song from the end of 1986 through the beginning of 1987. Sugiyama changed some of the lyrics representing Christmas to a form reminiscent of the New Year. In his 1989 album, Listen to my Heart, and his 2001 album, Heaven's Shore, they have different versions of the song, as well as the single "Saigono Holy Night '96" that has an English version of the song called "Last Holy Night (English version)."

Track listing

Charts

Weekly charts

Year-end charts

References 

1986 singles
1986 songs
Japanese Christmas songs